
This is a list of bridges documented by the Historic American Engineering Record in the U.S. state of Alaska.

Bridges

References

List
List
Alaska
Bridges, HAER
Bridges, HAER